The Saint Joseph of the Lake Church is located on the Menominee Indian Reservation in Menominee County, Wisconsin. It was added to the National Register of Historic Places in 2000.

History

Roman Catholic missionaries had settled in the area by 1875, serving both the Menominee and other white settlers. The cemetery for Roman Catholics and a burial ground for non-Roman Catholics were established soon after. Under the direction of Father Blase Krake, the church was constructed in the 1890s. The site would become a sanctuary for the Menominee to live their way of life. As the federal government of the United States began prohibiting many Native American tribes from speaking their traditional languages and performing their traditional ceremonies, the church allowed the Menominee to do such things on the property. It has been credited for allowing the Menominee way of life and traditions to be passed on to further generations.

References

Churches on the National Register of Historic Places in Wisconsin
Cemeteries on the National Register of Historic Places in Wisconsin
Former Roman Catholic church buildings in Wisconsin
Churches in the Roman Catholic Diocese of Green Bay
Roman Catholic cemeteries in Wisconsin
Churches in Menominee County, Wisconsin
Gothic Revival church buildings in Wisconsin
Native American history of Wisconsin
Roman Catholic churches completed in the 1890s
National Register of Historic Places in Menominee County, Wisconsin
19th-century Roman Catholic church buildings in the United States